Below are the squads for the 2003 Bandy World Championship final tournament in Sweden.

Group A

Belarus

Finland

Kazakhstan

Norway

Russia

Sweden
Coach: Anders Jakobsson

References

Bandy World Championship squads